Manuel Esteban Mosquera García (born 14 October 1984) is a football striker who currently plays in Panama for Río Abajo.

Club career
Mosquera played for Atlético Veragüense and Árabe Unido and had spells in Colombia with second division teams Academia and Itagüí Ditaires. He joined Plaza Amador for the 2012 Apertura season and moved abroad again in January 2013 to play for Honduran side Victoria. In April 2013 he got severely injured after a charge of Atlético Choloma defender Johnny Barrios, fracturing his tibia and fibula. He was sidelined for months and Barrios received a 5-match penalty.

In December 2013, Mosquera joined Río Abajo.

International career
Mosquera made his debut for Panama in a January 2009 UNCAF Nations Cup match against Costa Rica and has earned a total of 2 caps, scoring no goals. He represented his country at the 2009 UNCAF Nations Cup in Honduras where Panama were champions.

His final international was a January 2012 friendly match against the United States.

Honors

Club
 Liga Panameña de Fútbol (1): 2008 (C)
 '''Liga Panameña de Fútbol: Apertura 2009 II

National Teams
 UNCAF Nations Cup Champions (1): 2009

Notes

References

External links
 

1984 births
Living people
People from Pinogana District
Association football forwards
Panamanian footballers
Panama international footballers
2009 UNCAF Nations Cup players
Copa Centroamericana-winning players
Atlético Veragüense players
C.D. Árabe Unido players
Academia F.C. players
Águilas Doradas Rionegro players
C.D. Plaza Amador players
C.D. Victoria players
Panamanian expatriate footballers
Expatriate footballers in Colombia
Panamanian expatriate sportspeople in Colombia
Expatriate footballers in Honduras